Franco Volpi (11 July 1921 – 1 January 1997) was an Italian actor and voice actor.

Biography
Born in Milan, Volpi formed at the Accademia dei Filodrammatici and debuted on stage in 1938, aged 17, in the company held by Renzo Ricci and Laura Adani. He often worked with Ernesto Calindri, on stage, on television and in a popular series of commercials. He is regarded as one of the early stars of Italian television miniseries (the so-called "sceneggiati").

Volpi died of tumor, aged 75.

References

External links  
 

 

1921 births 
1997 deaths 
20th-century Italian male actors
Italian male film actors
Italian male stage actors 
Italian male television actors 
Italian male voice actors 
Male actors from Milan